Tu Chu-hsien (born 10 February 1979) is a Taiwanese football player. He currently plays for Taiwan Power Company F.C. as a defender or midfielder. He can play both right back and left back. Since 2008, Tu has served as assistant coach in Taipower.

Tu married Chang Hui-ching, also a footballer, in 2005.

Playing history 
 Wu-fu Primary School (五福國小)
 Feng-xi Junior High School (鳳西國中)
 Kao Yuan Senior High School of Technology and Commerce (高苑工商)
 Taipower

Career statistics

Honours
With Taiwan Power Company F.C.
Enterprise Football League: 2007, 2008

References

1979 births
Living people
Taiwan Power Company F.C. players
Taiwanese football managers
Taiwanese footballers
Taiwanese men's futsal players
Footballers from Kaohsiung
Association football defenders
Association football midfielders